The Michael J. Petrides School is a public school located at 715 Ocean Terrace in Staten Island, New York. It was created by Board of Education officials and named for their late colleague and College of Staten Island professor, Michael J. Petrides (1941–1994). The school opened on November 13, 1995, on the former campus of the College of Staten Island. Students apply to attend the school through a lottery system. 8th graders going into high school, receive auto-admission if Petrides is the first choice on their application. The current principal is Joanne Buckheit.

Petrides educates students from pre-Kindergarten through 12th grade, or senior year in high school. It has an assistant principal for each grade category (elementary, middle school, high school). They are:

 Jennifer Ponzi - Elementary School (Grades pre-K - 5)
 BettyAnn Souffrin - Middle School (Grades 6-8)
 Anthony Tabbitas - High School (Grades 9-12)

The Petrides School, like many other New York City public schools, also has paraprofessionals, speech therapists, occupational and physical therapists, deans, school aides, and a widely used bus transportation system.

Overview 

Set on what was once was the College of Staten Island campus, P.S. 80 serves students from kindergarten through high-school. The school opened in 1995, had its first graduating class in 2001. Its first group to complete all 13 years of schooling graduated in 2008.

The school enrolls about 90-100 pupils per grade from kindergarten through middle school and about 125 per grade in high school. Close to 1,000 students apply for about 75-90 kindergarten seats, and the school receives more than 1,200 applications for the 40 to 50 seats that open in 9th grade. Teachers work at every academic level, from the youngest grades through high school, and the "seamless" curriculum promises a smooth progression from year to year, with ample opportunity for arts, music, Advanced Placement classes, and electives. Students in grades 6 through 12 are assigned personal laptops, and can take advantage of the school’s technology resources. The school features hallways named with street signs for famous artists, architects, and inventors.

High-school students have the opportunity to travel overseas. Destinations have included Italy, Hungary, and Austria. Vermont, Michigan, and Hawaii were also destinations. Fundraisers are also held to help finance the high school's annual trip Habitat for Humanity. In addition, high school students can work with younger students in the elementary school, as classroom student mentors.

Special education 

"All classes contain a mix of students of different abilities. District 75, which enrolls children with severe disabilities, has a separate program at the Petrides complex, as part of PS 37."

Admissions 
Admissions are by lottery for grades K-8. For kindergarten, the school typically receives more than 800 applications for 75-90 seats, of which 15 are reserved for siblings of current students (separate lottery). The handful of open seats in the upper grades are filled by lottery, as well. In 9th grade, class sizes get larger and an extra class is added to the grade. Thousands of students apply for a total of 40 to 55 new seats. These seats are filled through the city's "educational option" formula, designed to achieve a mix of low, average, and high-performing students.

Controversy 
Within the past, there had been certain discrepancies according to the school's enrollment policy under the past principal. This was highlighted by a noticeable prevalence to kin relations within the student body and noted recommendations within an alleged random basis lottery system for enrollment. These were recorded in a 1998 investigation report. The report also recorded the absence of critical records that would determine the extent of the irregularities.

In November 2017, a student posed with a gun in a children's bathroom and uploaded the picture to social media. The school closed while authorities investigated, and afterwards several security measures were put in place.

From January 2018 to March 2018, several rape cases have been reported as having taken place at the school.

Extracurricular activities, clubs, and athletics

 National Honor Society
 SING!
 Student Government
 Council For Unity
 Petrides Against Cancer Society (PACS)
 Petrides Anime Club
 Astronomy Club
 Billion Oyster Project
 Cheerleading
 Chess Club
 Cooking Club
 Dungeons and Dragons Club
 Habitat for Humanity
 History Club
 Nintendo Club
 LGBTQ Club
 Math Team
 Media and Tech Club
 My Brother's Keeper
 My Sister's Keeper
 Newspaper
 Passport Club
 Pokémon, Magic and Yu-Gi-Oh Club
 Spoken word
 Yearbook
 Crochet Club
 Spring Musical
 Winter Concert
 Spring Concert

 Wrestling
 Cross-Country Track
 Indoor Track
 Outdoor Track
 Lacrosse
 Tennis
 Handball
 Fencing
 Football
 Soccer
 Softball
 Volleyball
 Baseball
 Swimming
 Basketball
 Bowling
 Golf

PSAL Championships 

Football Team 
2019

Baseball Team
2017

Boys' Wrestling Team
 2008
 2009
 2010
 2011

Girls' Bowling Team
 2008

Boys' Golf Team
 2009

Notable alumni
Tristan Wilds, Actor
Christine Evangelista, Actress, The Walking Dead

References

External links

Public high schools in Staten Island
Public elementary schools in Staten Island
Public middle schools in Staten Island
Todt Hill, Staten Island
K-12 schools in New York City